Prato is the common name for a traditional Austrian cookbook first published in 1858 by Katharina Prato (1818–97, born Polt) as The South German Cuisine. It became popular under the name The Large Prato (Die grosse Prato) and appeared  in 80 editions as well as several translations until 1957. In 1931 V. Leitmaier, the granddaughter of the author, published a shortened version called The Small Prato (Die kleine Prato).

References
The Culture Information System of the Austrian Ministry of Education, Science and Culture

Austrian cookbooks
Austrian cuisine
1858 books